Arezoo Hakimi Moghaddam (born in Hamedan, 18 April 1995) is an Iranian kayaker who was the youngest athlete in Iran team in 2012 Summer Olympics.

References

External links 
 https://web.archive.org/web/20120827161738/http://www.london2012.com/athlete/hakimimoghaddam-arezou-1077528/

Living people
1995 births
Iranian female canoeists
Canoeists at the 2012 Summer Olympics
Olympic canoeists of Iran
Asian Games bronze medalists for Iran
Asian Games medalists in canoeing
Canoeists at the 2014 Asian Games
Canoeists at the 2018 Asian Games
Medalists at the 2014 Asian Games